This is a list of ministers who have headed the Ministry of Education of Egypt.

List

Monarchical era (1873–1952)

Followed by Republican era (1952–present)

See also
Cabinet of Egypt

References

External links

 
Education